Ivana Luković (born 18 July 1992) is a volleyball player from Serbia, playing an opposite. She was a member of the Senior National Team of Serbia in 2013.

References

1992 births
Living people
Serbian women's volleyball players
Olympiacos Women's Volleyball players
Serbian expatriate sportspeople in Italy
Serbian expatriate sportspeople in Greece
Serbian expatriate sportspeople in Turkey
Serbian expatriate sportspeople in Thailand
Serbian expatriate sportspeople in Romania